Cueretú (Curetu) is an extinct language of the Amazon basin.  It may be Tucanoan, but more recently has been left unclassified due to sparsity of data.

References

Languages of Colombia
Tucanoan languages
Extinct languages of South America
Unclassified languages of South America